Willie Jerome Brown III (February 4, 1965 – June 25, 1992) was an American football defensive tackle for the Philadelphia Eagles of the National Football League (NFL). He played his entire five-year NFL career with the Eagles from 1987 to 1991, before his death just before the 1992 season. He was selected to two Pro Bowls in 1990 and 1991. He played college football at the University of Miami.

College career
Brown played college football at the University of Miami, where he was a standout player for one of college football's most successful and perhaps its most dominant program.  He graduated from the university in 1987.

Among his more notable moments as a Miami player, five days before the 1987 Fiesta Bowl, at a promotional Fiesta Bowl dinner with the Penn State team, Brown led a walkout by the Miami players.  Leading the walkout, he asked: "Did the Japanese go and sit down and have dinner with Pearl Harbor before they bombed them?"  Brown and his teammates felt that the Penn State players had disrespected them by openly mocking Miami's coach, Jimmy Johnson, at a pre-game banquet. Penn State beat the heavily favored Hurricanes 14-10, and were declared National Champions.

Days earlier, Brown and fellow University of Miami player Dan Sileo  drew even greater national controversy when each were seen deplaning a chartered University of Miami plane at Phoenix's Sky Harbor International Airport, wearing Battle Dress Uniforms.

Professional career
Brown was drafted in the first round (ninth overall) of the 1987 NFL Draft by the Philadelphia Eagles.  During his five-year professional career with the Eagles, he was twice selected to the Pro Bowl (in 1990 and 1991).

Brooksville
Brown graduated from Hernando High School in Brooksville, where he was often seen in the off season running laps around the track. In June 1988, he received praise for his calm demeanor as he helped disperse a group of Ku Klux Klan protesters in his hometown of Brooksville, Florida.

Death and legacy
Brown died on June 25, 1992, at the age of 27, following an automobile accident in Brooksville, in which both he and his 12-year-old nephew were killed when Brown lost control of his ZR1 Chevrolet Corvette at high speed and crashed into a palm tree.  Brown was buried in his hometown of Brooksville.

In 2000, the Jerome Brown Community Center was opened in Brooksville in memory of Brown.

Brown's son Dee Brown (born 1982) was drafted in the 10th round of the 2005 MLB Draft by the Washington Nationals. He played four seasons of minor league baseball as an outfielder in the Nationals farm system and another two seasons with the Winnipeg Goldeyes of the independent Northern League.

Brown and former teammate Reggie White were documented together in an episode of the NFL Network series A Football Life that aired in 2011. White, who died in 2004, was invited to speak at a Billy Graham Crusade being held in Philadelphia the day Brown was killed and was informed just before he went on stage of his friend's death. When he came up to the pulpit to speak, White deviated from his prepared remarks and his speech opened with the following:

An emotional White, pausing to wipe tears from his eyes, continued as the crowd gasped in shock at hearing that Brown was dead. He said that Brown was one of the best men he ever knew, praised his family, and called him one of his best friends.

Legacy

Along with teammate Reggie White, Brown helped anchor an Eagles defense that intimidated and dominated offenses of the late 1980s and early 1990s. By the end of the 1991 season, Brown had established himself as one of the league's premier defensive tackles, being elected as an All-Pro for a second consecutive year. Brown was not only a fan favorite, but a favorite of his first NFL head coach Buddy Ryan, who once remarked, "if you had 45 Jerome Browns, you would win every game."

Brown's jersey number (#99) was retired by the Eagles on September 6, 1992 in an emotional pre-game ceremony at Veterans Stadium, prior to the Eagles' first game of the 1992 season.  After his death, Eagles players and fans started the unofficial motto "Bring it home for Jerome," an indirect reference among Eagles fans to bringing a Super Bowl title to the city in Brown's honor. The Eagles would win Super Bowl LII on February 4, 2018, which would have been Brown's 53rd birthday.

Brown is mentioned in The Wonder Years track "We Could Die Like This" off their 4th album The Greatest Generation with the lyrics: "We watched the '92 Birds take the field without Jerome Brown".

References

1965 births
1992 deaths
Activists for African-American civil rights
African-American players of American football
All-American college football players
American football defensive tackles
Burials in Florida
Miami Hurricanes football players
National Conference Pro Bowl players
National Football League players with retired numbers
People from Brooksville, Florida
Philadelphia Eagles players
Players of American football from Florida
Road incident deaths in Florida
Sportspeople from the Tampa Bay area
Ed Block Courage Award recipients